Tom Yandle (Thomas Andrew Heath Yandle) (born 1935) of Riphay, Brushford, near Dulverton in Somerset, England, is a farmer and chairman of the Devon and Somerset Staghounds and was High Sheriff of Somerset in 1999 and a committee member of both the National Trust and Exmoor National Park. He played a leading role in challenging both the National Trust's decision to ban stag hunting on the Holnicote Estate and the Labour government's ultimately successful proposal to ban hunting with hounds. The Yandle family was previously resident at nearby Duvale an historic estate in the parish of Bampton, Devon. In 1994 he purchased Northmoor House near Dulverton, and 100 acres of surrounding land, which he later sold.

He wrote:  
As my father had a puritanical fear and dislike of drinking and pubs I never visited the Carnarvon Arms until after he died, but later I discovered that he had met my mother in the bar there and had frequented the hotel for 30 years. He was then 54 years old and my mother 24. and: My grandfather, a tenant of the Carnarvons all his life, told his four sons: 'Always keep ahead of your station. Better to be a good farmer than a little poor gentleman, and a good workman than a little poor farmer.

References

1935 births
High Sheriffs of Somerset
Living people